Alopoglossus lehmanni is a species of lizard in the family Alopoglossidae. The species is endemic to western Colombia.

Etymology
The specific name, lehmanni, is in honor of Colombian biologist Federico Carlos Lehmann-Valencia.

Geographic range
A. lehmanni is found in Valle del Cauca Department, Colombia.

Habitat
The natural habitat of A. lehmanni is forest.

Reproduction
A. lehmanni is oviparous.

References

Further reading
Ayala SC, Harris DM (1984). "A New Microteiid Lizard (Alopoglossus) from the Pacific Rainforest of Colombia". Herpetologica 40 (2): 154–158. (Alopoglossus lehmanni, new species).
Köhler G, Diethert H-H, Veselý M (2012). "A Contribution to the Knowledge of the Lizard Genus Alopoglossus (Squamata: Gymnophthalmidae)". Herpetological Monographs 26 (1): 173–188. (in English, with an abstract in Spanish).
Valencia-Zuleta A, Jaramillo-Martínez, Echeverry-Bocanegra A, Viáfara-Vega R, Hernández-Córdoba O, Cardona-Botero VE, Gutiérrez-Zúñiga J, Castro-Herrera F (2014). "Conservation status of the herpetofauna, protected areas, and current problems in Valle del Cauca, Colombia". Amphibian & Reptile Conservation 8 (2) [Special Section]: 1–18; S1-S24 (e87). (in English, with an abstract in Spanish).

Alopoglossus
Reptiles of Colombia
Endemic fauna of Colombia
Reptiles described in 1984
Taxa named by Stephen Charles Ayala
Taxa named by Dennis M. Harris